Ian Franklin Manson Engelmann (27 April 1933 – 4 March 1981) was a noted BBC television producer of such programmes as Great Orchestras of the World and The Last Night of the Proms.

A nephew of Franklin Engelmann, Engelmann as a child became a chorister at the Choir of Chichester Cathedral in Chichester, Sussex. He later attended St Paul's School, London.

As an adult, Engelmann joined the BBC as a studio manager in Radio Light Entertainment.  He later transferred to the BBC Television, where he specialised in light music, including Top of the Pops.  In 1966, Engelmann joined the Music and Arts Department.

Early career

While at Music and Arts, Engelmann developed his talents for both studio and film production, soon becoming one of the leading practitioners in his field. He had a talent for matching the appropriate image to his music, and a gift for finding common ground between the world of the professional musician and the general public.

Engelmann's programmes for the BBC Omnibus series included filmed portraits of Shostakovich, Pavarotti, and Plácido Domingo.  He also created programmes featuring The Wandsworth School Boys' Choir, the Trinidad Steel Band and a programme on Prime Minister Edward Heath titled The Other Edward Heath.

Awards and Recognition

Engelmann's film on Pavarotti, King of the High Cs was critically acclaimed and his film Music After Mao, about Vladimir Ashkenazy in Shanghai, was the BBC entry for the 1980 Prix Italia. In 1980 Engelmann won a coveted British Academy Award (BAFTA) for his 1979 live broadcast production of the Last Night of the Proms  in the category of Best Actuality Coverage.

Personal LIfe

In 1970 Engelmann formed his own choir, The Ian Engelmann Singers,, which continued to tour after his death.

Engelmann was a passionate dinghy sailor and was for many years the commodore of the BBC Ariel Sailing Club (based at the Tamesis Club in Teddington, London.)

Filmography
Sources: 
 in addition a full list of all accredited BBC Television Programmes can be found on this link:

References

1933 births
1981 deaths
British television producers
BBC people